James C. “Jim” Lynch (born September 5, 1946) is a former Republican member of the Pennsylvania House of Representatives.

He is a 1964 graduate of Sharon High School. He served in the U.S. Army from 1966 to 1969 and became a corporal. He earned a degree in business administration from Youngstown State University in 1973.

Lynch was first elected to represent the 65th legislative district in the Pennsylvania House of Representatives in 1992. During his career, Lynch introduced the law creating a dedicated funding stream for higher-education councils that help students in rural areas move from school to the workforce and the loan program to encourage the removal of leaky underground fuel storage tanks. He retired prior to the 2004 election.

References

External links
 official PA House profile (archived)
 - official Party website (archived)

1946 births
Living people
Republican Party members of the Pennsylvania House of Representatives
People from Warren County, Pennsylvania
Youngstown State University alumni
United States Army non-commissioned officers